Peter Pearson (born March 13, 1938) is a Canadian film director and screenwriter.

Biography
Pearson studied Political science and Economics at the University of Toronto and Television Production at Ryerson Institute of Technology before attending film school in Rome. Upon his return to Canada his first job was as a journalist for the Timmins Daily Press. In 1964 he was hired by the CBC and worked there for two years as a director-producer-writer. He joined the NFB in 1966 where he began making documentaries, including three with American social activist Saul Alinsky. His work received nineteen Canadian Film Awards – more than any other Canadian director. His two most notable features – The Best Damn Fiddler from Calabogie to Kaladar and Paperback Hero (1973) – are landmarks in English-Canadian cinema. From 1975 to 1981 he served as a director on the TV series For The Record, and was responsible for the innovative and controversial episodes The Insurance Man from Ingersoll (1976), Nest of Shadows (1976), Kathy Karuks is a Grizzly Bear (1976), The Tar Sands (1977) and Snowbirds (1981).

Pearson, like many of his contemporary filmmakers, was continually frustrated by the lack of opportunity in the Canadian film industry and remained a persistent lifelong activist and champion in the cause of Canadian cinema. From 1972 to 1975 he served as president of the Directors Guild of Canada and as chairman of the fifteen thousand-member Council of Canadian Filmmakers. After teaching film for one year at Queen's University (1982–83), he headed the Canadian Film Development Corporation's newly created Broadcast Program Development Fund from 1983 to 1985. The corporation became Telefilm Canada and he served as its Executive Director from 1985 to 1987.

Selected filmography
The Best Damn Fiddler from Calabogie to Kaladar (1968)
The Dowry (1969)
Seasons in the Mind (1970)
Paperback Hero (1973)
Along These Lines (1974)
A Thousand Miles of Holidays (1974)
Only God Knows (1974)
The Insurance Man from Ingersoll (1976)
 Heaven on Earth (1987)
Bananas from Sunny Quebec (1993)
L'Or et le Papier (1994)

References

External links

Complete Peter Pearson Filmography at CITWF
Films by Peter Pearson at NFB

1938 births
Living people
Film producers from Ontario
Canadian male screenwriters
Film directors from Toronto
Writers from Toronto
National Film Board of Canada people
Canadian television directors
Canadian documentary film directors
Canadian film executives
Best Director Genie and Canadian Screen Award winners
Canadian documentary film producers
20th-century Canadian screenwriters
20th-century Canadian male writers